Colonel Malcolm Frank Douglas-Pennant, 6th Baron Penrhyn DSO MBE (11 July 1908 – 8 November 2003), was a Welsh peer, soldier, rifleman, and farmer, and the second son of Frank Douglas-Pennant, 5th Baron Penrhyn.

Life
Penrhyn was educated at Eton and the Royal Military College, Sandhurst, before joining the 60th Rifles in 1929. He served in India and Burma before working with the Free French forces in North Africa during the Second World War. Douglas-Pennant was awarded an MBE for his involvement in the invasion of Sicily. After the war, he stayed on in Germany until 1948 and spent the rest of his military career training soldiers to fire rifles accurately. He was a noted sharpshooter, and was on the House of Lords shooting team. His older brother predeceased both him and his father without male issue. His father was 101 years and 74 days when he died on 3 February 1967 and was then the oldest ever hereditary peer, a record that was not surpassed until the death of the seventh Viscount St Vincent in September 2006. After Malcolm too died without male issue (he had two daughters), the title of Lord Penrhyn passed to his nephew.

References

1908 births
2003 deaths
Graduates of the Royal Military College, Sandhurst
King's Royal Rifle Corps officers
British Army personnel of World War II
Companions of the Distinguished Service Order
Members of the Order of the British Empire
People educated at Eton College
6
Malcolm
Younger sons of barons
Penrhyn